The Catacombs of Milos are a historical site located on Milos island, in Cyclades, Greece. They are found near the modern settlement of Trypiti, next to the site of the agora of the ancient city of Melos and 200 m to the east of the ancient theatre. The name Trypiti (Τρυπητή, "made with holes [τρύπες]") derives from the fact that the surrounding area is full of caves cut into the porous volcanic rock, which are still used by the inhabitants as storerooms and stables. In ancient times, however, these caves were used as family burial chambers.

The galleries are of differing widths, ranging from 1 to 5 metres in width and from 1.6 to 2.5 metres in height. In addition to the tombs cut into the walls, there are also many graves cut into the ground and covered with unworked stones of irregular sizes.

References

External links 

Official website 
 http://www.greeka.com/cyclades/milos/milos-excursions/catacombs-milos.htm
 http://www.greek-islands.us/milos/catacombs/
 https://web.archive.org/web/20140924043450/http://www.exploguide.com/site/catacombs-milos

Milos
Milos
Tourist attractions in the South Aegean